The 1887 Bucknell football team represented the Bucknell University during the 1887 college football season. Bucknell played in two games, losing both to Penn State. They did not score a single point in the season.

Schedule

References

Lewisburg
Bucknell Bison football seasons
College football winless seasons
Bucknell football